The Hungarian Challenger Open is a professional tennis tournament played on hard courts. It is currently part of the ATP Challenger Tour. It is held annually in Budapest, Hungary since 2016.

Past finals

Singles

Doubles

References

External links
 Official website

ATP Challenger Tour
Hard court tennis tournaments
Tennis tournaments in Hungary